Dayna Pidhoresky (born 18 November 1986) is a Canadian long-distance runner. She competed in the women's marathon at the 2017 World Championships in Athletics.

On 20 October 2019, Pidhoresky won the Canadian Olympic Trials Marathon in a time of 2:29.03. Her performance secured her position for the 2020 Tokyo Olympic Marathon representing Canada. However, on the flight to Tokyo, Pidhoresky was seated next to a passenger who subsequently tested positive for COVID-19, and as a result was required to quarantine for fourteen days without access to training facilities. Despite this, she opted to compete, finishing the race in seventy-third and last place with a time of 3:03:10. She said that "a month ago, that would have been so disappointing because I had big goals, but as we approached the race I really had to alter my goals. I didn't think I was going to make it to the start line."

References

External links
 
 

1986 births
Living people
Canadian female long-distance runners
Canadian female marathon runners
World Athletics Championships athletes for Canada
Sportspeople from Windsor, Ontario
Athletes (track and field) at the 2020 Summer Olympics
Olympic track and field athletes of Canada